The Europe Zone was one of the two regional zones of the 1927 International Lawn Tennis Challenge.

21 teams entered the Europe Zone, with the winner going on to compete in the Inter-Zonal Final against the winner of the America Zone. France defeated Denmark in the final, and went on to face Japan in the Inter-Zonal Final.

Draw

First round

Ireland vs. South Africa

Switzerland vs. Austria

Denmark vs. Netherlands

Great Britain vs. Sweden

Spain vs. India

Second round

France vs. Romania

Hungary vs. Italy

Portugal vs. Germany

Switzerland vs. South Africa

Great Britain vs. Denmark

Yugoslavia vs. India

Czechoslovakia vs. Greece

Belgium vs. Poland

Quarterfinals

Italy vs. France

Germany vs. South Africa

Denmark vs. India

Czechoslovakia vs. Belgium

Semifinals

South Africa vs. France

Czechoslovakia vs. Denmark

Final

Denmark vs. France

References

External links
Davis Cup official website

Davis Cup Europe/Africa Zone
Europe Zone
International Lawn Tennis Challenge
International Lawn Tennis Challenge
International Lawn Tennis Challenge